Carolyne Lepage (born June 9, 1975 in Montreal, Quebec) is a female judoka from Canada, who won the silver medal in the women's extra lightweight division (– 48 kg) at the 2003 Pan American Games in Santo Domingo, Dominican Republic. She represented her native country at two Summer Olympics: in 1996 and 2004.

References
  sports-reference

See also
Judo in Quebec
Judo in Canada
List of Canadian judoka

1975 births
Canadian female judoka
Judoka at the 1996 Summer Olympics
Judoka at the 2003 Pan American Games
Judoka at the 2004 Summer Olympics
Living people
Olympic judoka of Canada
Sportspeople from Montreal
Pan American Games silver medalists for Canada
Commonwealth Games medallists in judo
Commonwealth Games gold medallists for Canada
Pan American Games medalists in judo
Judoka at the 2002 Commonwealth Games
Medalists at the 2003 Pan American Games
20th-century Canadian women
21st-century Canadian women
Medallists at the 2002 Commonwealth Games